The Davao Eagle (also known as Davao Eagle Online or DEO) is an online media publication and a community blog that covers local tourism, personalities, and events concerning or related to Southern Mindanao

History
Davao Eagle Online (DEO) started as an online marketplace for Davaoeños in 2010. From there, it launched a different platform that supports Davao City. In 2011, Davao Eagle Online with its core team started writing about current events, local news, and stories it deemed inspiring. Later on, it became the hub for Davaoenos where they can find share-worthy stories in the Davao Region. In 2015, Davao Eagle Online bloggers, Pat Maruhomadil and Key Manatad, were nominated as 'Blogger of the Year' by Globe Telecom Media Excellence Awards for their write-ups about current events and local issues in Davao. In its 2016 Mindanao leg, DEO won the GMEA Social Media Campaign of the Year award for its Year-End Poll Awards 2015 (YEPA) campaign.

Content
Before Davao Eagle Online became a community blog, the website was built as an online marketplace for Davao Region.

The website delivers Davao related content and also President Rodrigo Duterte's policies when he was still a Mayor of Davao City. DEO also uses the Eagle as its symbol to give a "bird’s eye view" of what is happening in Davao Region.
In 2015, DEO published a video of a singing security guard who sang Back at One by Brian McKnight in which both ABS-CBN News and GMA News featured as a Viral Video.

Reception
By January 2017, the website had a total of 1.5 million users which Davao Eagle Online team claimed that it was the top blogging community in the City of Davao, surpassing the engagement metrics of local media groups in the region. The blog site, davaoeagle.com reportedly registered over 10 million hits from January 2015 – 2017.

Projects

YEPA 2015
The "Year-End Poll Awards 2015 (YEPA)" was introduced in 2015. The winners of the 2015 "Davao YEPA Awards" were announced on January 31, 2016 at Bogser's by the Sea Seafood Restaurant and Tiki Bar.

Nominees and winners

#GanDavao
In 2016, Davao Eagle Online launched "Project GanDavao (#GanDavao)". Through this project, the team aims to unite local talents and boost the local music and entertainment scene in the region Encourage local music artists and producers to create more original compositions to uplift the Davaoeño spirit and promote our culture, motivate local influencers to take part in boosting local tourism, promoting responsible use of social media, and inspire positive social change.

In June 2018, the team released the official lyric video of the song "GanDavao (#GanDavao), an independent collaborative project of Davao talents including local artists and social media influencers that aim to send the message of love to Filipinos and promote the beauty of being a Davaoeño and the Davao Region. The GanDavao team is composed of the Davao Eagle Online members, local artists and musicians, bloggers, and social media influencers who wanted to make a difference by introducing the Davaoeño talents and culture to the world and invite people to come and experience Davao Region.

The song was written by Fatima Maruhomadil, produced and arranged by Khail Tuboro (Khail SOLO) and features rap verses by Jovanny Sumabal and additional vocals from several other recording artists, including Maric Gavino, Thea Pitogo, Chrisel Joy dela Cruz, Pao Lofranco, Earl Aquino, Pau Pau Tolentino, The Echoistic (Ernest, Paula, Andrea, JR M. Galura), Blaine Corda Nasser, Cherry Lyn Acero Mayormita, Chierald Cadiente Tan, Christian Faunillan, Philippine Popular Music Festival 2018 "Grand Champion" Chud Festejo, Normilah Mae Ojendras Villanueva, Gracel Maganding, Singer/Composer of Himig Handog 2019 song "Ikaw at Linggo" Eamarie Gilayo, Nairud sa Wabad (Tatot Libres, Earl Gioielli), Ville Oliver Lonzaga, Mel Brian Agonia Ojendras, JR Oclarit, Madayaw Cultural Ensemble, Davao Conyo (Phillip Te Hernandez), Lara Borrega, Mans To, Rashley Ipanag and Ren Grace that formed the group "One Davao Artists".

Top 100 Faces of Davao
It is a contest designed to showcase Davao’s finest young men and women who are ambassadors of beauty, goodwill and success.

Nominees and winners

Awards
2014 Davao Blogs Awards - Best Gateway Blog (nominated).
2015 Globe Media Excellence Award - Blogger of the Year (nominated).
2016 Globe Media Excellence Award - Social Media Campaign of the Year (awardee).
2017 Globe Media Excellence Award - Social Media Campaign of the Year (nominated).
2017 Globe Media Excellence Award - Blogger of the Year (nominated).

Staff

Editors
Key Manatad
Pat Maruhomadil
Jimmer Ariate

Member Contributors
Cherry Lynn Mayormita
Mel Brian Ojendras
Dave Stephenn Villamora
Nath Mindanao
Ethel Joyce Boligor
Julius Gabriel Alba
Normilah Mae Villanueva
Jefrry Puno

See also
 Rappler
 When In Manila

References

External links
 
 
 

Culture of Davao City
Mass media in Davao City
Philippine news websites